Ibrahima Ryan Bakayoko (born 13 February 2002) is a French professional footballer who plays as a forward for Niort.

Career
A youth product of Montpellier, Castelnau Le Crès, and Nîmes, Bakayoko began his senior career with the reserves of Nîmes in 2019. He returned to Montpellier on 20 June 2020 and was assigned to their reserves. Scoring 9 goals in 25 games with Montpellier II, he transferred to Niort in the Ligue 2 on 21 May 2022. He made his professional debut with Niort in a 1–0 Ligue 2 win over FC Annecy on 30 July 2022, coming on as a sub in the 85th minute.

Personal life
Bakayoko is the nephew of the retired Ivorian footballer Ibrahima Bakayoko.

References

External links
 

2002 births
Living people
Sportspeople from Montpellier
French footballers
French sportspeople of Ivorian descent
Chamois Niortais F.C. players
Ligue 2 players
Championnat National 2 players
Championnat National 3 players
Association football midfielders